The 2010–11 Biathlon World Cup - World Cup 4 was held in Oberhof, Germany, from 5 January until 9 January 2011.

Schedule of events 
The time schedule of the event stands below

Medal winners

Men

Women

Achievements
 Best performance for all time

 , 10th place in Sprint
 , 40th place in Sprint
 , 50th place in Sprint
 , 87th place in Sprint
 , 1st place in Sprint
 , 6th place in Sprint
 , 19th place in Sprint
 , 33rd place in Sprint
 , 35th place in Sprint
 , 46th place in Sprint
 , 65th place in Sprint
 , 67th place in Sprint
 , 77th place in Sprint
 , 79th place in Sprint

 First World Cup race

 , 86th place in Sprint
 , 91st place in Sprint
 , 96th place in Sprint
 , 97th place in Sprint
 , 50th place in Sprint
 , 70th place in Sprint
 , 80th place in Sprint

References 

- World Cup 4, 2010-11 Biathlon World Cup
Biathlon World Cup - World Cup 4, 2010-11
January 2011 sports events in Europe
Biathlon competitions in Germany
Sport in Oberhof, Germany
Sport in Thuringia
2010s in Thuringia